The Bradford Hotel in Lisbon, North Dakota was built in 1909.  It has also been known as the Lisbon Hotel.

It was listed on the National Register of Historic Places in 1987.

It was built for approximately $25,000 in 1909.

References

Hotel buildings on the National Register of Historic Places in North Dakota
Hotel buildings completed in 1909
National Register of Historic Places in Ransom County, North Dakota
Lisbon, North Dakota
1909 establishments in North Dakota
Federal architecture in North Dakota